Ferdinand Marie Auguste Baston, Count de Lariboisière (1 January 1856 – 3 May 1931) was a French military officer and politician. He served as mayor of Louvigné-du-Désert, and as a general councillor, deputy, and senator of Ille-et-Vilaine. He was appointed as a chevalier of the Legion of Honour.

Personal life
Baston was born on 1 January 1856 in Paris, the son of Honoré-Charles Baston de Lariboisière, a military officer and politician. His grandfather was Jean Ambroise Baston de Lariboisière, a general who fought in the French Revolutionary Wars and the Napoleonic Wars.

Baston died on 3 May 1931 in Paris.

Politics
Baston was first elected to the Chamber of Deputies as a deputy for Ille-et-Vilaine in 1882. He was re-elected in October 1885 but resigned the following month. In 1886, he was elected as a general councillor for Louvigné-du-Désert; he also became mayor of the commune that year.

Baston returned to the French Parliament in 1906, this time being elected as a senator for Ille-et-Vilaine. He resigned as senator in 1919, having been once again elected as a deputy; he was re-elected in 1924. He resigned as a general councillor in 1925, and retired from politics in 1928.

Equestrian
Baston competed in the equestrian mail coach event at the 1900 Summer Olympics.

References

External links
 

1856 births
1931 deaths
Chevaliers of the Légion d'honneur
French male equestrians
Olympic equestrians of France
Equestrians at the 1900 Summer Olympics
Sportspeople from Paris
Members of the 3rd Chamber of Deputies of the French Third Republic
Members of the 4th Chamber of Deputies of the French Third Republic
Members of the 12th Chamber of Deputies of the French Third Republic
Members of the 13th Chamber of Deputies of the French Third Republic
French Senators of the Third Republic
Senators of Ille-et-Vilaine